Rabba Main Kya Karoon is 2013 Indian Hindi-language romantic comedy film directed by Amrit Sagar Chopra and produced by Moti Sagar. The film features Akash Sagar Chopra, Arshad Warsi, Paresh Rawal, Tahira Kochhar and Riya Sen as main characters.

Plot
Rabba Main Kya Karoon  revolves around two brothers Shrawan (Arshad Warsi) and his younger brother Sahil (Akash Sagar Chopra) who is getting married lavishly in a typical Indian style in Delhi.

Sahil is eager to marry his childhood sweetheart Sneha (Tahira Kochhar), until older brother Shrawan joins the celebration, encouraging Sahil to do what men do by cheating on his wife. Shrawan is only teaching Sahil what he learnt from their uncles (Paresh Rawal, Tinnu Anand and Shakti Kapoor), whose mantra for a successful married life is "In order to live a happy married life, one must cheat on his wife!"

Cast
 Akash Sagar Chopra as Sahil
Tahira Kochhar as Sneha
Arshad Warsi as Shrawan Singh Choudhary
Riya Sen as Namrata/Nammo
Raj Babbar as Choudhary Shebaar Karan Singh/Tauji
Anuradha Patel as Gunjan
Varun Sharma as Gagan
Paresh Rawal as Popat Mama
Sushmita Mukherjee as Babita Mami
Shakti Kapoor as Narendra Suri/Harry
 Supriya Karnik as Bubble
Rakesh Bedi as Sneha's Father
Navni Parihar as Sneha's Mother
Tinnu Anand as Gujral Mama
Himani Shivpuri as Dolly Mama
 Tanisha Pawar as Megha
 Anmol Karnik as Bass Guitarist
 Dhruvee Haldankar as Sneha's friend

Soundtrack

The official soundtrack was composed by duo Salim–Sulaiman and consists of 6 tracks.

References

External links
 

2010s Hindi-language films